Callipodidae is a family of millipedes belonging to the order Callipodida.

Genera:
 Anopetalum Verhoeff, 1941
 Callipus Risso, 1826
 Euopus Leach, 1830
 Lysiopetalum
 Sardopus Strasser, 1974
 Silvestria

References

Callipodida
Millipede families